Sunbiggin Tarn is a tarn near Sunbiggin in Cumbria.  It is in a Site of Special Scientific Interest (SSSI) which also includes the surrounding moorland and limestone pavement of Little Asby Scar.

Site history

Site location and designation

Significant site content

Flora
common bent, mother of thyme, sheep fescue, Sesleria albicans, Galium sterneri grassland
Calluna vulgaris Erica cinerea, Vaccinium myrtillus heath
Scirpus cespitosus, Erica tetralix wet heath
Carex elata, Equisetum fluviatile, Cladium mariscus, Carex rostrata, Potentilla palustris, Phragmites australis swamp, sedge and reed-beds

Fauna
black-headed gull, gadwall, little grebe, osprey, starling, water rail, wigeon Geyer's whorl snail

Geology
Dinantian, Karst

References

External links

Glacial lakes
Sites of Special Scientific Interest in Cumbria
Sites of Special Scientific Interest notified in 1994
Orton, Eden